She's Beautiful When She's Angry is a 2014 American documentary film about some of the women involved in the second wave feminism movement in the United States. It was directed by Mary Dore and co-produced by Nancy Kennedy. It was the first documentary film to cover feminism's second wave.

Overview 
She's Beautiful When She's Angry documents the Women's Liberation Movement in the United States. It showcases the activist's key concerns during the years 1966–1971 including employment discrimination, affordable childcare, reproductive health, and sexuality, which collectively became known as "women's issues". It also delves into the divisive sides of the movement, such as homophobia, race, and class.

The documentary runs for 92 minutes and features a mixture of archival footage, press clippings, present day interview narration, and readings of contemporary works. It begins by outlining the social climate of the 1960s and describes some of the first events of the women's liberation, including the publication of Betty Friedan's landmark text The Feminine Mystique and the founding of the National Organization for Women (NOW). It describes how the women's movement linked to other movements in the United States such as the civil rights movement, the antiwar movement, and the New Left. Also featured in the documentary are the authors of the landmark feminist book Our Bodies, Ourselves and ex-members of the underground abortion organization the Jane Collective. The documentary ends with coverage of the 1970 Women's Strike for Equality and the lasting accomplishments of the movement.

It features the following activists, shown here in alphabetical order:

 Chude Pamela Allen
 Alta
 Judith Arcana  
 Fran Beal 
 Heather Booth
 Rita Mae Brown
 Susan Brownmiller
 Linda Burnham
 Jacqueline Ceballos 
 Mary Jean Collins 
 Roxanne Dunbar-Ortiz
 Susan Griffin 
 Muriel Fox
 Jo Freeman
 Carol Giardina
 Karla Jay  
 Kate Millett
 Eleanor Holmes Norton
 Denise Oliver-Vélez
 Trina Robbins
 Ruth Rosen
 Vivian Rothstein
 Marlene Sanders
 Alix Kates Shulman
 Ellen Shumsky
 Marilyn Webb 
 Virginia Whitehill
 Ellen Willis 
 Nona Willis-Aronowitz
 Alice Wolfson
 Women of the Our Bodies, Ourselves Collective

Production 
She's Beautiful When She's Angry was directed and produced by first-time documentarian Mary Dore, who was herself active in the Women's Liberation Movement during the mid 70s. It was co-produced by Nancy Kennedy. The filmmakers said they made the documentary to inspire people to continue to advocate for gender equality.

The rights to the film were bought by Music Box Films in 2016 who released it on DVD and iTunes. In 2018, the film was available on Netflix.

Reception 
The documentary debuted in New York City on December 5, 2014 and in Los Angeles on December 12, 2014. It continued to screen across the United States and other countries including Canada, Australia, Turkey, South Korea, Ireland, and Spain. As of May 2021, the film has a score of 80 on Metacritic based on 12 critic reviews.

Critical reception 
Jordan Hoffman of The Guardian gave the film three out of five stars calling it a "well-deserved appreciation of these women", but criticized the film's sometimes disjointed approach. Alan Scherstuhl of The Village Voice described the documentary as the best filmed account of how the women's movement "changed the workplace, our sexual politics, our language." Ann Hornaday of The Washington Post gave the documentary two and a half out of four stars, citing "awkward reenactments and other stylistic clunkers" but concluded that "it serves as a moving reminder of how crucial citizen action is in fomenting social change."

References

External links 
 
 

2014 films
Documentary films about feminism
Liberal feminism
Second-wave feminism
2010s English-language films